Aydın (also spelled Ajdin, Aiden, Ayden, or Aydin is a Turkic male given name meaning enlightened and bright in the Azeri and Turkish languages. Notable people with the given name or surname include:

Given name
 Aydin Aghdashloo (born 1940), Iranian painter
 Aydin Balayev (1956–2021), Azerbaijani historian, ethnologist, and professor
 Aydın Boysan (1921–2018), Turkish architect
 Aydın Dikmen (1937–2020), Turkish  art dealer
 Aydın Doğan (born 1936), Turkish  entrepreneur
 Ajdin Draga (1864–1914), Albanian politician
 Aydın Güven Gürkan (1941–2006), Turkish academic and politician
 Ajdin Hasić (born 2001), Bosnian footballer
 Ajdin Hrustic (born 1996), Australian footballer
 Aydın Karabulut (born 1988), Turkish-German footballer
 Aydın Kurtoğlu (born 1983), Turkish composer, singer, and songwriter
 Ajdin Maksumić (born 1985), Bosnian footballer
 Aydin Mirzazade (born 1957), Azerbaijani politician
 Ajdin Muzaka (fl. 1443–1444), Albanian military commander
 Ajdin Nukić (born 1997), Bosnian footballer
 Aydın Örs (born 1946), Turkish basketball coach
 Ajdin Penava (born 1997), Bosnian basketball player
 Aydin Rajabov (born 1944), Azerbaijani artist
 Ajdin Redžić (disambiguation), multiple people
 Aydın Sayılı (1913–1993), Turkish historian
 Aydin Senkut, American investor and tech executive
 Aydın Adnan Sezgin (born 1956), Turkish diplomat and politician
 Aydin Suleymanli, Azerbaijani chess Grandmaster
 Aydın Toscalı (born 1980), Turkish footballer
 Aydın Yelken (1939–2022), Turkish footballer 
 Aydın Yılmaz (born 1988), Turkish footballer

Surname
 Aras Aydın (born 1989), Turkish actor
 Bahtiyar Aydın (1946–1993), Turkish army general
 Bilgesu Aydın (born 1994), Turkish football player
 Ebru Aydın (born 1973), Turkish singer and songwriter
 Elif Sıla Aydın (born 1996), Turkish handball player
 Emre Aydın (born 1981), Turkish rock singer-songwriter
 Eren Aydın (born 1982), Turkish footballer
 Furkan Aydın (born 1991), Turkish footballer
 Lütfiye Aydın (born 1949), Turkish writer
 Mehmet Aydın (born 1943), Turkish professor of philosophy and religion
 Merve Aydın (born 1990), Turkish athlete
 Merve Aydın (basketball) (born 1994), Turkish basketball player
 Mirkan Aydın (born 1987), German-Turkish footballer
 Mustafa Aydın (born 1967), Turkish professor of International relations
 Okan Aydın (born 1994), Turkish-German footballer
 Selçuk Aydın (born 1983), Turkish boxer
 Vahide Aydın (born 1968), Austrian-Turkish politician and social worker
 Yiğit Caner Aydın (born 1992), Turkish para archer

See also
 Aidan (name)
 Aidin (name)
 Ayten (disambiguation)

References